In July 2021, France played a three-test series against Australia as part of the 2021 July International window. The series was played in a condensed window of 11 days, due to French club commitments and hotel quarantine period for the visitors. This is France's first tour to Australia since 2014 and their first encounter since November 2016.

Fixtures

Squads
Note: Ages, caps and clubs are as per 7 July, the first test match of the tour.

France
On 20 June 2021, Galthié named a 42-man squad for France's three-test series against Australia.

Coaching team:
 Head coach:  Fabien Galthié
 Forwards coach:  William Servat
 Backs coach:  Laurent Labit
 Defence coach:  Shaun Edwards

Australia
A 38-man Wallabies squad was named for the 2021 series against France on 13 June 2021.

Coaching team:
 Head coach:  Dave Rennie
 Forwards coach:  Dan McKellar
 Backs coach:  Scott Wisemantel
 Defence coach:  Matt Taylor

Matches

First test

Notes:
 Florent Vanverberghe (France) had been named on the bench, but withdrew the day before the game due to injury and was replaced by Cyril Cazeaux.
 Andrew Kellaway Lachlan Lonergan and Darcy Swain (all Australia) and Gaëtan Barlot, Anthony Étrillard, Sipili Falatea, Teddy Iribaren, Melvyn Jaminet and Quentin Walcker (all France) made their international debuts.

Second test

Notes:
 Len Ikitau (Australia) and Pierre-Henri Azagoh, Ibrahim Diallo, Enzo Forletta and Wilfrid Hounkpatin (all France) made their international debuts.
 France win in Australia for the first time since their 28–19 victory in Sydney in the final test of their 1990 tour.

Third test

Notes:
 Cyril Cazeaux (France) was named to start but withdrew ahead of the game and was replaced by Pierre-Henri Azagoh. Baptiste Pesenti replaced Azagoh on the bench.
 Alexandre Bécognée, Antoine Hastoy and Julien Hériteau (all France) made their international debuts.
 Australia retain the Trophée des Bicentenaires.
 Australia win a home test-series for the first time since France last toured to Australia in 2014.

See also
 2021 July rugby union tests

References

Notes

France national rugby union team tours
Rugby union tours of Australia
History of rugby union matches between Australia and France
France rugby union tour of Australia
2020–21 in French rugby union
France rugby union tour of Australia